Adetoneura is a monotypic moth genus in the subfamily Lymantriinae. Its only species, Adetoneura lentiginosa, is found on Fiji. Both the genus and the species were first described by Cyril Leslie Collenette in 1933.

References

Moths described in 1933
Lymantriinae
Monotypic moth genera